
Gmina Golczewo is an urban-rural gmina (administrative district) in Kamień County, West Pomeranian Voivodeship, in north-western Poland.

Villages
Apart from the town of Golczewo, Gmina Golczewo contains the villages and settlements of Baczysław, Barnisławice, Dargoszewko, Dargoszewo, Dobromyśl, Drzewica, Gacko, Gadom, Golczewo-Gaj, Imno, Kłęby, Kłodzino, Koplino, Kozielice, Kretlewo, Książ, Mechowo, Niemica, Niwka, Ronica, Samlino, Sosnowice, Strażnica, Unibórz, Upadły, Wołowiec, Wysoka Kamieńska, Żabie and Zielonka.

Neighbouring gminas
Gmina Golczewo is bordered by the gminas of Gryfice, Kamień Pomorski, Nowogard, Płoty, Przybiernów, Świerzno and Wolin.

References
Polish official population figures 2006

Golczewo
Kamień County